Alinja may refer to:

 Alinja 
 Alinja, Iran 
 Alinja Arena 
 Alinja Tower